Matthew Francis Kalil (born July 6, 1989) is a former American football offensive tackle. He played college football at USC and was drafted by the Minnesota Vikings fourth overall in the 2012 NFL Draft. He was also a member of the Carolina Panthers and Houston Texans.

High school career
Kalil attended Servite High School in Anaheim, California, where he played for the Servite Friars high school football team. He made the 2005 Cal-Hi Sports All-State Sophomore first-team.

As a junior in 2006, he made Cal-Hi Sports All-State first-team, Cal-Hi Sports All-State Underclass first-team, All-CIF Pac-5 Division first-team, Los Angeles Times All-Star and All-Trinity League Co-Lineman of the Year.

His 2007 senior season honors included Parade All-American, Super Prep All-American, Prep Star All-American, EA Sports All-American first-team, USA Today All-USA second-team, Scout.com All-American second-team, and ESPN 150, as a senior offensive and defensive lineman at Servite High in Anaheim. Kalil also participated in track & field at Servite, where he had top-throws of 13.55 meters (44 feet, 4 inches) in the shot put and 39.80 meters (130 feet, 5 inches) in the discus.

Considered a five-star recruit by Rivals.com, Kalil was listed as the No. 3 offensive tackle in the class of 2008. He played in the 2008 U.S. Army All-American Bowl on a West squad that featured fellow USC offensive lineman Tyron Smith.

College career

After redshirting his initial year at USC, Kalil served as backup to Tyron Smith at right tackle. He started against Boston College and performed well, and saw limited action in 11 other games (all but Arizona State) and played primarily on special teams. In his sophomore year, Kalil beat Smith to replace Charles Brown at left tackle, where he started all 13 games. He also played on the defensive line for special teams and blocked a point after touchdown against Notre Dame.

As a junior, Kalil retained his starting left tackle spot, helping the Trojans average 456.8 yards of total offense. The Trojans' offensive line only allowed an FBS-low eight sacks of quarterback Matt Barkley, none of which were allowed by Kalil. For his effort, Kalil was named to several All-American teams, while also becoming the 12th Trojan offensive lineman to win the Morris Trophy. Kalil was also semifinalist for the 2011 Lombardi Award.

Professional career
Kalil was regarded as the best offensive tackle prospect for the 2012 NFL Draft. He declared for the draft on December 16. After a strong performance at the NFL Combine, Kalil was projected to be the No. 3 draft pick by the Minnesota Vikings. The Vikings eventually selected Kalil, but not until trading down to the No. 4 spot. They had not selected an offensive lineman in the first round since Bryant McKinnie in 2002.

Kalil was USC's fifth offensive lineman selected in the top-5 of an NFL Draft, after Ron Yary in 1968, Marvin Powell in 1977, Anthony Muñoz in 1980, and Tony Boselli in 1995. With Tyron Smith having been selected ninth overall in 2011, it also made USC the first school with consecutive top-10 selected offensive lineman since Texas' Leonard Davis (2001) and Mike Williams (2002).

Minnesota Vikings
Kalil was signed to a four-year contract by the Minnesota Vikings on July 26, 2012. He was selected to attend the Pro Bowl after Washington Redskins offensive tackle Trent Williams was injured during a night club fight. In week 6 of the 2013 NFL season, he faced off against his brother, Ryan Kalil, and the visiting Carolina Panthers, in which the Panthers won 35-10. Also in that game, the Kalils' sister, Danielle Kalil, sang the national anthem.

On September 21, 2016, Kalil was placed on injured reserve with a hip injury.

Carolina Panthers
On March 10, 2017, Kalil signed a five-year, $55 million contract with the Carolina Panthers. He and his brother Ryan  were the third set of brothers to play on the same offensive line in the NFL and the first set of brothers to do it in 24 years. In his first season with the Panthers, he started all 16 games at left tackle.

On September 2, 2018, Kalil was placed on injured reserve after undergoing a knee scope.

On March 14, 2019, Kalil was released by the Panthers.

Houston Texans
On March 22, 2019, Kalil signed with the Houston Texans. On September 1, 2019, Kalil was released by the Houston Texans.

Personal life
Kalil's father, Frank, was a center at Arkansas and Arizona, and was drafted by the Buffalo Bills in 1982, before playing for the USFL's Arizona Wranglers in 1983 and Houston Gamblers in 1984. His brother Ryan was an All-American at Southern California, and was drafted by the Carolina Panthers in 2007. Their sister Danielle sang the national anthem at the Vikings–Panthers game, which featured both of her brothers, on October 13, 2013.

On July 8, 2015, he married model Haley O'Brien in a secret ceremony on a private beach in Kauai. On July 8, 2016, they had a formal ceremony with friends and family. The couple had a very private relationship. They lived in Minnesota, North Carolina, California, and finally New York City until their split in 2022.

References

External links

 
 USC Trojans bio

1989 births
Living people
Players of American football from California
American sportspeople of Mexican descent
American people of Lebanese descent
Sportspeople from Corona, California
American football offensive tackles
Servite High School alumni
USC Trojans football players
Minnesota Vikings players
Carolina Panthers players
Houston Texans players
Sportspeople of Lebanese descent
National Conference Pro Bowl players